Veselá bída  is a 1944 Czechoslovak musical comedy film, directed by Miroslav Cikán. It stars  Jarmila Ksírová, František Kreuzmann, and Hana Vítová.

References

External links
Veselá bída  at the Internet Movie Database

1944 films
Czechoslovak musical comedy films
1944 musical comedy films
Films directed by Miroslav Cikán
Czech musical comedy films
Czechoslovak black-and-white films
1940s Czech films